John Stanley Hook (born 27 May 1954) was an English cricketer. He was a right-handed batsman and right-arm off-break bowler who played for Somerset. He was born in Weston-super-Mare.

Hook played for Somerset's second eleven in the Minor Counties Championship from 1973 to 1975, and made a single first-class appearance for the first team, against Oxford University in 1975. From the lower order, he scored 4 not out in the first innings of the match and 3 runs in the second innings. In 12 overs, he failed to take a wicket.

References

External links
John Hook at Cricket Archive

1954 births
Living people
English cricketers
Somerset cricketers
People from Weston-super-Mare